London and North Eastern Railway (LNER) Thompson Class B1 No. 1264, (later British Railways No. 61264, and Departmental No. 29) is a preserved British steam locomotive.

Service 
1264 was built in 1947 by the North British Locomotive Company, Works No. 26165.  It was initially allocated to Parkeston Quay (shed code 30F), near Harwich, for working the Great Eastern Main Line, and would remain there for 13 years.  In January 1948, 1264 passed into the ownership of British Railways, and in March it was allocated the number 61264, though this was not applied until October 1949.  The class were given the power classification 5MT by BR.

In November 1960, 61264 was transferred from Parkeston Quay to Colwick Depot (38A), near Nottingham, for working the Great Central Main Line. It would remain there until it was withdrawn in December 1965.

Departmental service 

That was not the end of its BR service however as it was transferred to departmental stock, and renumbered 29 in the Eastern Region departmental stock series. There it was used as a mobile boiler for heating carriages. It had its couplings removed so it couldn't haul trains, but could still propel itself.

29 was withdrawn from departmental stock in July 1967. It was initially stored, but in March 1968 it was sold for scrap.

Preservation 
However, luck was on its side: 61264 was sold to Woodham Brothers scrapyard, Barry Island, the only former LNER locomotive to be sent to Barry. By the time the locomotive was rescued from scrap in 1973, the 83rd engine to leave Barry, it was the last surviving ex-LNER locomotive not preserved.

Restoration took some time; the boiler and firebox were in such poor condition that a new boiler and firebox seemed the only option, but steady work during the 1980s and 1990s restored the original boiler and the completed engine moved under its own power in 1997, finished in LNER Apple green as No. 1264. It is currently in BR Black livery as 61264. It was withdrawn from service (mid-2008) for a 10-year overhaul at LNWR Crewe and, once finished moved to the North Yorkshire Moors Railway. 61264 returned to the mainline in 2014 with a test run in early January followed by double-heading the Winter Cumbrian Mountain Express from Manchester Victoria to Carlisle with LMS Stanier Class 5 4-6-0 45407 organised by the Railway Touring Company.

From December 2012 until July 2022 the locomotive was based at the North Yorkshire Moors Railway and used on both mainline railtours alongside the NYMR's services between Grosmont and Whitby. The locomotive is now based at the Nottingham Heritage Railway and is in the process of undergoing a Network Rail standard overhaul.

61264 is one of two surviving Thompson Class B1s, but the only LNER-built example, the other being BR-built 61306.

References

External links 
 www.facebook.com/B1locotrust
 Thompson B1 Locomotive Trust

4-6-0 locomotives
NBL locomotives
Preserved London and North Eastern Railway steam locomotives
Railway locomotives introduced in 1947
Locomotives saved from Woodham Brothers scrapyard